Kim King (born November 29, 1962) is an American politician and a Republican member of the Kentucky House of Representatives representing District 55 since January 4, 2011.

Education
King earned her BA from Eastern Kentucky University.

Elections
2012 King and former Democratic Representative Stevens were both unopposed for their May 22, 2012 primaries, setting up a rematch; King won the November 6, 2012 General election with 12,931 votes (61.1%) against Representative Stevens.
2010 To challenge District 55 incumbent Democratic Representative Kent Stevens, King was unopposed for the May 18, 2010 Republican Primary and won the November 2, 2010 General election with 9,167 votes (53.4%) against Representative Sims.

References

External links
Official page at the Kentucky General Assembly

Kim King at Ballotpedia
Kim King at OpenSecrets

Place of birth missing (living people)
1962 births
Living people
Eastern Kentucky University alumni
Republican Party members of the Kentucky House of Representatives
People from Harrodsburg, Kentucky
Women state legislators in Kentucky
21st-century American politicians
21st-century American women politicians